The 2020–21 Cymru North season (also known as the 2020–21 JD Cymru North season for sponsorship reasons) would have been the second season of the second-tier northern region football in Welsh football pyramid.  Teams were to play each other twice on a home and away basis.

Prestatyn Town were the defending champions.  They were not promoted last season due to the fact that they did not meet FAW tier 1 guidelines.  Second placed Flint Town United were promoted instead. Because of the COVID-19 pandemic in Wales, this season was cancelled.

Teams
The National League consists of 16 clubs.

Team Changes

To Cymru North
Promoted from Mid Wales Football League Division 1
 Llanidloes Town

Promoted from Welsh Alliance League Division 1
 Holyhead Hotspur

Promoted from Welsh National League Division 1
 Holywell Town

Relegated from Cymru Premier
 Airbus UK Broughton

From Cymru North
Promoted to Cymru Premier
 Flint Town United

Relegated to Ardal NE
 Corwen
 Llanfair United

Relegated to Ardal NW
 Porthmadog

Stadia and Locations

Source: |footballgroundmap.com Cymru North Ground Information

Season overview
Rhyl competed in the Cymru North league for the 2019–20 season.  However, they were wound up on 21 April 2020. A phoenix club was set up the following month with the new name (voted by the fans association) of CPD Y Rhyl 1879. It was confirmed that the new club has secured the use of the Belle Vue stadium.  Therefore, this league was reduced to sixteen teams.

The Professional Registration Periods for the 2020–21 season were as follows:
The first period was to open on 27 July 2020 and was to close at midnight on 16 October 2020.
Dates for the second period were to be confirmed prior to the season's cancellation.
Summer transfers can be found  here.

Since anti-COVID-19 restrictions were put in place by FAW, as from Monday 10 August 2020, clubs could have trained in groups of 15 and contact training was allowed at all-levels of football.  However, competitive and exhibition matches were still not allowed to take place. The FAW eventually cancelled the 2020–21 season on 18 March 2021 because Cymru North and South did not have their Elite Status designation reinstated by the National Sport Group.

League table

Results

Season statistics

Top scorers

League placing

Fair Play winner
The winner for each respective division's FAW Fair Play Table will be given £1,000 prize money and the FAW Fair Play Trophy.

References

External links
Football Association of Wales
Cymru North Football
Ardal Northern Twitter Page

2020–21 in Welsh football
Cymru North seasons
Wales